The Europe Zone was one of the two regional zones of the 1946 Davis Cup.

15 teams entered the Europe Zone, with the winner going on to compete in the Inter-Zonal Final against the winner of the America Zone. Sweden defeated Yugoslavia in the final, and went on to face the United States in the Inter-Zonal Final.

Draw

First round

Sweden vs. Netherlands

Belgium vs. Monaco

Denmark vs. China

France vs. Great Britain

Spain vs. Switzerland

Yugoslavia vs. Egypt

Quarterfinals

Sweden vs. Ireland

Belgium vs. China

Switzerland vs. France

Czechoslovakia vs. Yugoslavia

Semifinals

Sweden vs. Belgium

France vs. Yugoslavia

Final

Sweden vs. Yugoslavia

References

External links
Davis Cup official website

Davis Cup Europe/Africa Zone
Europe Zone
Davis Cup